Thirteen Senses are a post-Britpop band from Penzance, Cornwall. The group released the album The Invitation on 27 September 2004, along with several singles: "Thru the Glass", "Do No Wrong", "Into the Fire" and "The Salt Wound Routine", of which the first three reached the top 40 of the UK Singles Chart. Their second album, Contact, was released in April 2007. Thirteen Senses are the only Cornish band to have a top 20 single.

History
Thirteen Senses started out as Soul Magician, that began in school when Will South started writing songs which he showed Adam Wilson. He in turn liked the songs and left the other band he was in at the time. Soul Magician took off when South and Wilson met Tom Welham. The latter knew Brendon James and they all became friends.

In 2002 Soul Magician released an EP, Inside A Healing Mind, which was produced by Leon Phillips. It consisted of four tracks, one of which was later released as a B-side. "Attracting Submission" is found on the "Do No Wrong" 7" vinyl. After that came in 2002 the No Other Life Is Attractive EP: the first Thirteen Senses release, produced by Dare Mason. This had five tracks. Four of them have been released as B-sides, the exception being "Sound". They then issued in 2003, Falls In The Dark, a self-released and independent demo album.

The band's next release and major label debut album was The Invitation. This consisted of twelve tracks and reached number 14 in the UK Albums Chart on its re-release.

At the beginning of 2004, and before The Invitation, Thirteen Senses released their first single, "Thru the Glass". This was released on both CD and 7" vinyl. The B-side was identical on both releases: "No Other Life Is Attractive". Later, the next single was "Do No Wrong" and it reached number 38 in the official UK Singles Chart. To promote it, Thirteen Senses went on tour, including a homecoming gig at the Hall for Cornwall in Truro.

The third single from the band was "Into the Fire". This was also released on two CDs and vinyl "Into The Fire" was used on BBC One's Match of the Day. After this came a re-release of "Thru the Glass" which broke the group into the UK Top 20.

The band toured both in the UK and Europe in 2005 and made several appearances at festivals such as Glastonbury, T in the Park and V Festival.

The band spent much of the latter part of 2005 and early 2006 in the recording studio, working on their next album, Contact. It was released on 2 April 2007. It was originally planned to be released in February 2007 but after playing three pre-album gigs at The Luminaire in London (on the thirteenth of the months of October, November and December), the band produced new tracks. "Talking to Sirens", one of the new tracks from Contact, was only played at the last gig. Due to the new album release date, their UK tour was rescheduled for March.

On 28 August 2007 Thirteen Senses announced through their website that they had begun recording their third album, and between April–July 2008 they previewed samples of 8 demo recordings on their MySpace page.  After several months without official contact from the band, on 28 May 2009, Brendon James announced that their third studio album was close to completion and it would, "all being well, be released within the next 2–3 months".

On 16 March 2010 the band made their third album Crystal Sounds available to stream on their website, thirteensenses.com. A day later they announced this on their MySpace page and said the album would be available to stream "for a limited time". The physical version of Crystal Sounds was released on 21 February 2011 with four tracks not featured on the early release.

On 27 February 2013, the band announced via Facebook and Twitter that "work on a new album is reaching its conclusion... more news coming soon...!"

On 6 February 2014, the band announced via Facebook and Twitter that their fourth album A Strange Encounter would be released on 5 May 2014.

Band members
 Will South – vocals, piano, guitar
 Tom Welham – guitar, backing vocals
 Adam Wilson – bass guitar
 Brendon James – drums, percussion

Discography

Albums
The Invitation (27 September 2004, Mercury) #14 UK
Contact (2 April 2007, Mercury) #76 UK
Crystal Sounds (21 February 2011, B-Sirius)
A Strange Encounter (5 May 2014, B-Sirius)

EPs and demo albums
Inside a Healing Mind EP (2002, as Soul Magician)
No Other Life Is Attractive EP (December 2002)
Falls in the Dark demo album (April 2003)

Singles

Music videos
"Thru the Glass" [first version] (2004)
"Do No Wrong" (2004)
"Into the Fire" (2004)
"Thru the Glass" [second version] (2005)
"Thru the Glass" [alternative version] (2005)
"The Salt Wound Routine" (2005)
"All the Love in Your Hands" (2007)
"Follow Me" (2007)
"The Loneliest Star" (2011)
"Home" (2011)

Songs in other media

References

External links

 Official site
 lewisslade.com/thirteensenses
 
 Thirteen Senses at MusicBrainz

Musicians from Cornwall
English pop music groups
English rock music groups
Post-Britpop groups
Musical groups established in 2001